Tynewydd is a village located in the County Borough of Rhondda Cynon Taf, south Wales. With Treherbert, Blaencwm, Blaenrhondda and Pen-yr-englyn it is part of a community of Treherbert. The village lies in the former industrial coal mining area at the head of Rhondda Fawr, the larger of the Rhondda Valleys.

History
It is believed that the village was named after 'Tynewydd' (built 1652) a longhouse in nearby Blaenrhondda. The area was sparsely populated before the 18th century, but after the successful mining of the South Wales coalfield the area experienced a population boom in the late 19th century. In 1865 Ebenezer Lewis, the owner of the Bwllfa Dare Colliery in Aberdare, purchased the lease of mineral property at Tynewydd on the east side of the River Rhondda. An old level on the hillside was reopened and a shaft was sunk to exploit the lower levels. This mine was named Tynewydd Colliery (not to be confused with Tynewydd Colliery in nearby Porth, site of an 1877 disaster) and in 1868 ownership was transferred to Rhondda Merthyr Colliery Company for £50,000. The mine remained profitable until 1879 when a geological fault affected production. In 1887 the mine was purchased by Messrs L and H Gueret, and efficient production was re-established. Despite producing 100,000 tons of coal in 1910 by 1911 it had closed.

Transport
The village is connected to the national rail transport network by Treherbert railway station, northern terminus of the Rhondda Line, originally the Taff Vale Railway line connecting the Rhondda and Swansea Bay Railway with the Rhondda Fawr collieries. The Rhondda Fawr line was extended from Dinas to Treherbert in 1856 and passenger services to Treherbert began in 1863.

References

Bibliography
Heroic Endeavour, by Major D.V. Henderson, pub. Hayward & Sons, 1988,

External links
 Photo of Craig-Y-Ddellw Mountain, Tynewydd, c. 1955, at Francis Frith Photos website, accessed 16 December 2010
 "TREHERBERT and YSTRAD-RHONDDA with the parish and hamlets of Ystradyfodwg, Blaen-y-cwm, Blaen-y-Rhondda, Cwmdare, Cwmpark, Llwynpia, Pen-y-Graig, Penyrenglyn, Pentre, Ton-Pentre, Tonypandy, Treorky, Tynewydd and Tynybedw", from Slaters Commercial Directory, 1880, transcribed by Phil Mustoe, at GEN UKI UK and Ireland Genealogy website, accessed 16 December 2010

Villages in Rhondda Cynon Taf